WSCF-FM (91.9 MHz) is a radio station broadcasting a contemporary Christian format. Licensed to Vero Beach, Florida, the station is currently owned by Central Educational Broadcasting, Inc. Christian FM also broadcasts on 96.3 FM in Port St. Lucie. In 2011, the station moved its facilities near to I-95 in Vero Beach, Florida. Prior to its current facilities, the station operated from the Central Assembly of God's main campus, located just west of the Indian River Mall. The station's transmitter is still located behind the church.

WSCF-FM began broadcasts on February 1, 1990, and was the first contemporary Christian radio station to serve the Treasure Coast and Space Coast areas of Florida.

WSCF-FM also serves as the flagship station for the Christian FM Networks, which serves scores of stations across the US with Christian music and personalities. Christian FM Networks syndicates the format and programming via Dial Global.

Translators

External links 
 

Radio stations established in 1990
1990 establishments in Florida
SCF-FM